Gug Daraq (also Romanized as Gūg Daraq and Gūgdarraq; also known as Gagdaraq, Gogdarag, Gorg Daraq, and Gūk Daraq) is a village in Barvanan-e Gharbi Rural District, Torkamanchay District, Meyaneh County, East Azerbaijan Province, Iran. At the 2006 census, its population was 491, in 125 families.

References 

Populated places in Meyaneh County